Dallas Township is an inactive township in St. Clair County, in the U.S. state of Missouri.

Dallas Township was erected in 1872.

References

Townships in Missouri
Townships in St. Clair County, Missouri